Self Explanatory is the ninth studio album by American singer Ne-Yo. It was released by Compound Entertainment and Motown on July 15, 2022.

Critical reception

Andy Kellman of AllMusic gave Self Explanatory three and a half stars out of five and called it Ne-Yo's "most biographical album yet." Ammar Kalia from The Guardian remarked that "strong vocals and head-nodding moments aside, the R&B singer-songwriter's latest record falls short of his career highs." He found that "the pleasant nostalgia of [the] highlights isn't enough to carry the record as a whole: tracks such as "Proud of You," "Call Me Up" and "No Loot" play as mid-tempo filler."

Chart performance
Self Explanatory debuted at number 184 on the US Billboard 200 in the week ending July 30, 2022. This marked Ne-Yo's lowest-charting debut since his 2019 Christmas album Another Kind of Christmas failed to chart. On Billboards component charts, the album also entered the Current Album Sales at number 59.

Track listing

Personnel
Musicians
 Ne-Yo – vocals
 Zae France – vocals (track 1)
 RoccStar – programming (2)
 Cardiak – programming (2)
 Hitmaka – programming (2)
 Paul Cabbin – programming (2)
 Retro Future – programming (6)
 Jeremiah – vocals (6)
 Trippie Redd – rap vocals (7)
 Ebenezer – programming (9, 10)
 Magnus Klausen – programming (9, 10)
 Curtis "Sauce" Wilson – vocal programming (9, 10)
 Yung Bleu – rap vocals (13)

Technical
 Gene Grimaldi – mastering (1, 2, 4–13)
 Kevin "KD" Davis – mixing (1, 2, 4–13)
 Jaycen Joshua – mastering, mixing (3)
 Curtis "Sauce" Wilson – engineering, vocal production
 DJ Riggins – mixing assistance (3)
 Jacob Richards – mixing assistance (3)
 Mike Seaberg – mixing assistance (3)

Charts

Release history

References

2022 albums
Ne-Yo albums
Motown albums